Colcha "K" Municipality is the first municipal section of the Nor Lípez Province in the Potosí Department in Bolivia. Its seat is Colcha "K" or Villa Martín.

Geography
The municipality lies at the Uyuni salt flat.

Some of the highest mountains of the municipality are listed below:

Subdivision 
The municipality consists of the following cantons:
 Atulcha Canton - 102 inhabitants (2001)
 Chuvica Canton - 53 inhabitants
 Calcha "K" Canton - 617 inhabitants
 Cocani Canton - 1.982 inhabitants
 Colcha "K" Canton - 1.229 inhabitants
 Julaca Canton - 61 inhabitants
 Llavica Canton - 274 inhabitants
 Río Grande Canton - 777 inhabitants
 San Cristóbal Canton - 1.980 inhabitants
 San Juan Canton - 981 inhabitants
 Santiago Canton - 509 inhabitants
 Santiago de Agencha Canton - 258 inhabitants
 Soniquera Canton - 822 inhabitants

The people 
The people are predominantly indigenous citizens of Quechua descent.

See also 
 Ch'iyar Quta
 Laqaya
 Puka Mayu

References 

Municipalities of Potosí Department